Carlos Machado (born 18 June 1980 in Córdoba, Andalusia) is a Spanish table tennis player. He plays right-handed and his best rank is 57th.  After appearing at the 2012 Summer Olympics, he and teammate He Zhi Wen won a bronze medal at the 2013 European Table Tennis Championships.

References 

Spanish male table tennis players
Sportspeople from Córdoba, Spain
1980 births
Living people
Table tennis players at the 2012 Summer Olympics
Olympic table tennis players of Spain
European Games competitors for Spain
Table tennis players at the 2015 European Games
Mediterranean Games bronze medalists for Spain
Competitors at the 2009 Mediterranean Games
Mediterranean Games medalists in table tennis